Flaming Lead is a 1939 American Western film directed by Sam Newfield and written by Joseph O'Donnell. The film stars Ken Maynard, Eleanor Stewart, Dave O'Brien, Walter Long, Tom London and Reed Howes. The film was released on November 1, 1939, by Colony Pictures.

Plot

Cast          
Ken Maynard as Ken Clark
Eleanor Stewart as Kay Burke 
Dave O'Brien as Frank Gordon
Walter Long as Jim Greely
Tom London as Bart Daggett
Reed Howes as Tex Hanlon
Ralph Peters as Panhandle
Carleton Young as Hank 
Kenne Duncan as Larry 
Bob Terry as Blackie 
Joyce Rogers as Gertie

References

External links
 

1939 films
American Western (genre) films
1939 Western (genre) films
Films directed by Sam Newfield
American black-and-white films
1930s English-language films
1930s American films